With the exception of temporary recess appointments, in order for a Justice to be appointed to the United States Supreme Court, they must be approved by a vote of the United States Senate after being nominated by the president of the United States Senate. Not all nominees put forward by presidents have advanced to confirmation votes.

General overview of the history of Supreme Court confirmation votes
Article II, Section 2, Clause 2 of the United States Constitution, known as the Appointments Clause, empowers the President of the United States to nominate and, with the confirmation (advice and consent) of the United States Senate, appoint public officials, including justices of the Supreme Court. The president has the plenary power to nominate and to appoint, while the Senate possesses the plenary power to reject or confirm the nominee prior to their appointment.

Of the 163 nominations that presidents have submitted for the court, 137 have progressed to a full-Senate vote. 126 were confirmed by the Senate, while 11 were rejected. Of the 126 nominees that were confirmed, 119 served (seven of those who were confirmed declined to serve, while one died before taking office).

The last nomination confirmed by a voice vote was that of Abe Fortas on August 11, 1965. The last time a roll call vote on a nomination was unanimous was that of Anthony Kennedy on February 3, 1988.

The first of the eleven roll call votes to result in a rejection of a nomination was the December 15, 1795 vote on the nomination of John Rutledge for chief justice, and the most recent time was the October 23, 1887 vote on the nomination of Robert Bork.

In March 1917, the procedure of a cloture vote was introduced to the Standing Rules of the United States Senate as a means of ending debate and proceeding to a vote. Until 1975, cloture required the support threshold of two-thirds of senators present and voting. From 1975 until 2017, the threshold needed to invoke cloture for Supreme Court confirmation was three-fifths of all senators duly chosen and sworn-in (60 senators, if there was no more than one seat left vacant). On April 6, 2017, when considering the nomination of Neil Gorsuch, in a party-line vote the Republican Senate majority invoked the so-called "nuclear option", voting to reinterpret Senate Rule XXII and change the cloture vote threshold for Supreme Court nominations to a simple majority of senators present and voting.

List of confirmation votes

Votes before and during the First Party System: 1789–1823

Votes during the Jacksonian–National Republican era: 1826–1836

Votes during the Second Party System: 1836–1853

Votes during the Third Party System: 1857–present

List of cloture votes
On occasion, a cloture vote has been taken in an effort to end Senate debate and allow a confirmation vote to take place.

Between the 1917 (when cloture was introduced to the Senate) and year 1975, cloture required the support threshold of two-thirds of senators present and voting. From 1975 until 2017, the threshold needed to invoke cloture for Supreme Court confirmation was three-fifths of all senators duly chosen and sworn-in (60 senators, if there was no more than one seat left vacant). On April 7, 2017, the votes of Democratic senators managed to deny enough support for cloture on the nomination of Neil Gorsuch. The Senate's Republican majority used the "nuclear option" to reduce the threshold for cloture to a simple 50% majority of votes, and Gorsuch met this new cloture threshold in the subsequent reconsideration. Ever since this, the threshold has been a simple 50% majority of votes.

The first attempt to invoke cloture on a Supreme Court nomination occurred in 1968 on the nomination to elevate Associate Justice Abe Fortas to chief justice. The first cloture motion to succeed was on the 1986 nomination to elevate Associate Justice William Rehnquist to chief justice.

See also
Nomination and confirmation to the Supreme Court of the United States
List of nominations to the Supreme Court of the United States
Unsuccessful nominations to the Supreme Court of the United States
Senate Judiciary Committee reviews of nominations to the Supreme Court of the United States

Notes

References

Confirmation votes
confirmation votes for the Supreme Court of the United States